Yustynivka is a village in Ternopil Raion of Ternopil Oblast in western Ukraine. It belongs to Pidhaitsi urban hromada, one of the hromadas of Ukraine.  The population is 250.

History 

The village was founded in the late 18th Century, around 13km north-east of Pidhaytsi. The village was an ethnic German colony, and had the name Beckersdorf. In 1945, the German inhabitants were forced to leave the territory.

Hans Moretti, the illusionist and escapologist, was born (as Johannes Crewe) in Yustynivka in 1928, when it was still known as Beckersdorf.

References

External links 
 Pidhaytsi

Villages in Ternopil Raion